Monceau-le-Neuf-et-Faucouzy is a commune in the Aisne département in Hauts-de-France in northern France.

Population

Personalities linked to the commune
 Edmond Biernat: footballer and accordionist, born 1939 in Monceau-le-Neuf

See also

Communes of the Aisne department

References

Communes of Aisne